Cymoninus notabilis is a species of true bug in the family Ninidae. It is found in the Caribbean Sea, Central America, North America, and South America.

References

Lygaeoidea
Articles created by Qbugbot
Insects described in 1882